White Salmon Glacier is in North Cascades National Park in the U.S. state of Washington, on the west slopes of Mount Shuksan. White Salmon Glacier is a series of small glaciers that descend to the north from a ridge feature known as Shuksan Arm. A climbers route follows the White Salmon Glacier to Fisher Chimney which provides a faster approach than others to the summit of Mount Shuksan.

See also
List of glaciers in the United States

References

Glaciers of the North Cascades
Glaciers of Whatcom County, Washington
Glaciers of Washington (state)